The Marsden Medal is a yearly award given by the New Zealand Association of Scientists. It is named after Sir Ernest Marsden and  honours "a lifetime of outstanding service to the cause or profession of science, in recognition of service rendered to the cause or profession of science in the widest connotation of the phrase." It rivals the Rutherford Medal from the Royal Society of New Zealand.

Recipients

See also
 Rutherford Medal
 List of general science and technology awards 
 List of awards named after people

References 

New Zealand science and technology awards
Science and technology in New Zealand